John Lennon Park or Parque John Lennon (formerly known as Parque Menocal) is a public park, located in the Vedado district in Havana, Cuba.

Overview
On one of the benches of the park, nearer the corner of streets 17th and 6th, there is a sculpture of the former Beatles member John Lennon, sculpted by Cuban artist José Villa Soberón, seated on the bench's right end. On a marble tile at the foot of the bench there is an inscription reading: "Dirás que soy un soñador pero no soy el único" John Lennon, which is a Spanish translation of the English lyrics, "You may say I'm a dreamer, but I'm not the only one," from the song "Imagine".

The sculpture of Lennon is currently not wearing his signature round-lens glasses, which have been stolen, or vandalized, several times. However, during the day, a security guard can be found sitting next to the bench, and he will place glasses on the statue if there is a request.

The statue was unveiled on 8 December 2000, the 20th anniversary of Lennon's murder. One year later, Cuban author Ernesto Juan Castellanos wrote a book about the statue, John Lennon en La Habana with a little help from my friends, and about the ban that John Lennon and The Beatles suffered in Cuba during the 1960s and 1970s.

Gallery

See also 
Lennon Wall

References

CNN article

External links

Geography of Havana
Tourist attractions in Havana
Parks in Cuba
Monuments and memorials to John Lennon